Holcosus hartwegi, also known commonly as the rainbow ameiva, is a species of lizard in the family Teiidae. The species is native to Guatemala and Mexico.

References

hartwegi
Reptiles of North America
Reptiles described in 1940